Veerapandian is an Indian surname. Notable people with the surname include:

Jega Veerapandian, Indian politician
Suba Veerapandian (born 1952), Indian writer and politician

Indian surnames